Diaporthe rudis is a plant pathogen.

References

Fungal plant pathogens and diseases
rudis
Fungi described in 1828